Zarrukh Adashev (born July 29, 1992) is an Uzbek professional kickboxer and professional mixed martial artist who competes in the Flyweight division and formerly in the Bantamweight division. He formely competed in the Ultimate Fighting Championship (UFC) and Bellator MMA.

Kickboxing Career
In 2012, Adashev started his professional career in kickboxing and MMA. His professional kickboxing record is 16-3-0

Adashev placed second in the under 75 kg class in the 2012 WKA world championship. He weighed in at 59 kg but fought at 75 kg.

Mixed martial arts career

Ring Of Combat
Adashev faced Cody Mooney in his professional MMA debut at Ring Of Combat 51 on June 5, 2015. He lost via rear naked choke submission.

Bellator MMA
Adashev made his Bellator debut against Christian Medina on October 13, 2018, at Bellator 208. He won the fight via TKO in the first round.

Adashev faced Ronie Arana Leon in his sophomore appearance on February 15, 2019, at Bellator 215. He won the fight via unanimous decision.

Adashev faced Tevin Dyce on October 26, 2019, at Bellator 232. He won the fight via TKO in the second round.

Ultimate Fighting Championship
Adashev faced Tyson Nam, replacing Ryan Benoit on June 13, 2020, at UFC on ESPN: Eye vs. Calvillo. At the weigh-ins, Adashev weighed in at 138.5 pounds, 2.5 pounds over the non-title bantamweight limit of 136 pounds. The bout proceeded as a catchweight and Adashev was fined 20% of his purse. He lost the fight via first-round knockout.

Adashev was scheduled to face Jeff Molina on November 14, 2020, at UFC Fight Night: Felder vs. dos Anjos, before the bout was rescheduled for UFC Fight Night 185. However, Molina withdrew from the event at the end of December 2020. Adashev instead faced Su Mudaerji on January 20, 2021, at UFC on ESPN 20. He lost the fight via unanimous decision.

Adashev was scheduled to face Ryan Benoit on May 8, 2021, at UFC on ESPN 24. At the weigh-ins, Benoit weighed in at 129 pounds, three pounds over the flyweight non-title fight limit. His bout with Adashev was cancelled by the Nevada State Athletic Commission due to health concerns.

Adashev was scheduled to face Juancamilo Ronderos on July 31, 2021, at UFC on ESPN 28. However, Ronderos was removed from the event for undisclosed reasons and was replaced by Ryan Benoit. Adashev won the fight via unanimous decision.

Adashev was scheduled to face Kleydson Rodrigues on January 15, 2022, at UFC on ESPN 32. However, in early January 2022, it was reported that the bout was canceled after Rodrigues tested positive for influenza (H3N2) and Adashev suffered an injury.

Adashev faced Ode' Osbourne on June 4, 2022, at UFC Fight Night 207. He lost the fight via knockout in the first round.

At the end of June, it was announced that he was no longer on the UFC roster.

Titles and Achievements
Hand to Hand Combat
 2010 - Asian champion in Qarshi
 2011 - International champion
 2011 - International champion
 2012 - WKA World championships silver medalist in Orlando, Florida 
 2013 - WKU K-1 world champion

Mixed martial arts record

|-
|Loss
|align=center|4–4
|Ode' Osbourne
|KO (punches)
|UFC Fight Night: Volkov vs. Rozenstruik
|
|align=center|1
|align=center|1:01
|Las Vegas, Nevada, United States
|
|-
|Win
|align=center|4–3
|Ryan Benoit
|Decision (unanimous)
|UFC on ESPN: Hall vs. Strickland
|
|align=center|3
|align=center|5:00
|Las Vegas, Nevada, United States
|
|-
|Loss
|align=center|3–3
|Su Mudaerji
|Decision (unanimous)
|UFC on ESPN: Chiesa vs. Magny
|
|align=center|3
|align=center|5:00
|Abu Dhabi, United Arab Emirates
|
|-
|Loss
|align=center|3–2
|Tyson Nam
|KO (punch)
|UFC on ESPN: Eye vs. Calvillo
|
|align=center|1
|align=center|0:32
|Las Vegas, Nevada, United States
|
|-
|Win
|align=center|3–1
|Tevin Dyce
|TKO (punches)
|Bellator 232
|
|align=center|2
|align=center|1:39
|Uncasville, Connecticut, United States
|
|-
|Win
|align=center|2–1
|Ronie Arana Leon
|Decision (unanimous)
|Bellator 215
|
|align=center|3
|align=center|5:00
|Uncasville, Connecticut, United States
|
|-
|Win
|align=center|1–1
|Christian Medina
|TKO (punches)
|Bellator 208
|
|align=center|1
|align=center|1:08
|Uniondale, New York, United States
|
|-
|Loss
|align=center|0–1
|Cody Mooney
|Submission (rear-naked choke)
|Ring of Combat 51
|
|align=center|1
|align=center|3:41
|Atlantic City, New Jersey, United States
|
|-

References

External References
Fight Time.ru
Sherdog.com
Bellator.com
Topology.com
MMBoxing.ru

m:Bellator MMA:https://en.wikipedia.org/wiki/Bellator_MMA_in_2018

1992 births
Living people
People from Samarkand
Uzbekistani male mixed martial artists
Flyweight mixed martial artists
Bantamweight mixed martial artists
Mixed martial artists utilizing kickboxing
Mixed martial artists utilizing wrestling
Uzbekistani male kickboxers
Ultimate Fighting Championship male fighters